James Millander Hanks (February 12, 1833 – May 24, 1909) was an American U.S. Representative from Arkansas.

Born in Helena, Arkansas, Hanks attended the public schools, the college at New Albany, Indiana, and Jackson College, Columbia, Tennessee.
He studied law.
He was graduated from the University of Louisville in 1855.
He was admitted to the bar and commenced practice in Helena. He owned slaves. 
He served as judge of the first judicial district of Arkansas 1864-1868.

Hanks was elected as a Democrat to the 42nd United States Congress (March 4, 1871 – March 3, 1873).
He was not a candidate for renomination in 1872.
He engaged in agricultural pursuits.
He died in Helena, Arkansas
He was interred in Maple Hill Cemetery.

References

1833 births
1909 deaths
People from Phillips County, Arkansas
American people of English descent
Democratic Party members of the United States House of Representatives from Arkansas
Arkansas state court judges
Arkansas lawyers
American slave owners
19th-century American politicians
19th-century American judges
University of Louisville alumni